Arthur Harold Smith was a Welsh footballer who played as a goalkeeper in the Football League for Wrexham.

Personal life 
Smith's brother Cecil was also a footballer.

Career statistics

References 

Footballers from Wrexham
Welsh footballers
Wrexham A.F.C. players
English Football League players
Year of birth unknown
Year of death unknown
Association football goalkeepers
Macclesfield Town F.C. players